Julius Wandera Maganda, also Julius Maganda, is a Ugandan politician. He was the State Minister for East African Affairs in the Ugandan Cabinet. He was appointed to that position on 6 June 2016, serving there until May 2021.

Background and education
He was born in Busia District the Eastern Region of Uganda, on 13 August 1971. He attended Bulekei Primary School for his elementary schooling. He then studied at Masaba College Busia for his O-Level education. He then completed his A-Level studies at Mbale High School, in Mbale, Mbale District.

He has a Bachelor of Public Administration degree from the Islamic University in Uganda, awarded in 2007, and a Certificate in Legal Practice, from the Law Development Centre, obtained in 2009. His Postgraduate Diploma in Management was awarded by the Uganda Management Institute in 2014.

Pre-political career
From 2000 until 2004, he was a branch manager for DHL Global. For the five years from 2004 until 2009, he worked as the regional manager for an outfit called P80 Nedloyd. From 2010, he serves as the Country Director of Goomag Logistics.

Political career
In 2016 he entered Ugandan elective politics by successfully contesting the Samia Bugwe County South parliamentary Constituency, on the ruling National Resistance Movement political party ticket. He won and was re-elected in 2016. He is the incumbent MP in the 10th parliament (2016 to 2021). In June 2016, he was appointed as the State Minister of the Est African Community Affairs.

Other consideration
In his capacity as the State Minister responsible for the East African Community, he qualifies to serve as an ex-officio member of the East African Legislative Assembly. He was duly sworn in on 31 August 2016.

See also
 Cabinet of Uganda
 Parliament of Uganda

References

1971 births
Living people
Samia people
Government ministers of Uganda
Law Development Centre alumni
People from Busia District, Uganda
Islamic University in Uganda alumni
People from Eastern Region, Uganda
Members of the Parliament of Uganda
Uganda Management Institute alumni
National Resistance Movement politicians
Members of the East African Legislative Assembly
21st-century Ugandan politicians